Lumpaci the Vagabond is a 1922 German silent film directed by Carl Wilhelm and starring Hans Albers, Hans Brausewetter, and Wilhelm Diegelmann.

The film's sets were designed by the art director Carl Ludwig Kirmse.

Cast
In alphabetical order

See also 
Lumpaci the Vagabond (1936)

References

Bibliography

External links

1922 films
1922 comedy films
German comedy films
Films of the Weimar Republic
Films directed by Carl Wilhelm
German silent feature films
German black-and-white films
German films based on plays
UFA GmbH films
Silent comedy films
1920s German films